Manitoba Provincial Road 207 (PR 207) is a provincial road in Manitoba, Canada.  Much of PR 207 follows the historic Old Dawson Trail.

Route description
PR 207 begins at PR 213 (Garven Road), northeast of Winnipeg and heads south, intersecting PTH 15 and then the Trans-Canada Highway (PTH 1) at a junction known as Deacon's Corner.  Five kilometres south of the Trans-Canada Highway, the road turns east and follows the old Dawson Road route to the communities of Lorette, Dufresne, and Ste. Anne.  Approximately seven kilometres west of Richer, PR 207 turns north and ends at the Trans-Canada Highway.

PR 207 is a paved, two-lane road, except between Dufresne and Ste. Anne, where it is a gravel road.  The road has a speed limit of 90 km/h.

The Dawson Road segment of PR 207 between Lorette and Ste. Anne was the original course for PTH 12.  A more direct route for PTH 12 was later built to the north; this route is now PTH 1.

See also
Old Dawson Trail

External links
Official Manitoba Highway Map

207